Dimitrios Kottaridis (born 29 May 1981) is a Greek former professional footballer who played as a goalkeeper.

Playing career
Kottaridis started his professional career in Kozani F.C. where he stayed for six years. In 2005, Veria F.C. signed Dimitris Kottaridis on a free transfer. Kottaridis was part of Veria's squad for over eight years, having won promotion to Superleague Greece two times. At the end of season 2013-14 he retired from professional football.

Honours
Football League (Greece): 2
Runner-up: 2011-12, 3rd Place: 2006-07

Coaching career
In September 26, 2013 Veria announced that Kottaridis would be their new goalkeeping coach after Jovan Mihailovic's departure. After Georgiadis' and his staff were fired from the club, Kottaridis returned to his post as Goalkeeper coach of the club.

References

External links
Guardian Football

Greek footballers
1981 births
Footballers from Kozani
Living people
Veria F.C. players
Super League Greece players
Football League (Greece) players
Association football goalkeepers